ETAS may refer to:

 ETAS, a global company providing tools and solutions for embedded systems
 End of Train Air System, a device put at the end of trains to monitor the brake air
Etas, an imprint of Rizzoli Libri division of Arnoldo Mondadori Editore
Former ICAO code for Sembach Kaserne.

See also 
 Eta (disambiguation)